The First Yanev Government was the ninety-fourth Cabinet of Bulgaria. It took office on 12 May 2021. It was a caretaker government chaired by prime minister Stefan Yanev. It was appointed by president Rumen Radev following the April 2021 Bulgarian parliamentary election. It was succeeded by Yanev's second government.

Cabinet

References

Politics of Bulgaria
Bulgarian governments
Cabinets established in 2021
2021 establishments in Bulgaria